FACT or FACTS may refer to:

Organizations
 FACT NET, Fight Against Coercive Tactics Network
Falsely Accused Carers and Teachers, a British support group
Federation Against Copyright Theft, UK
Federation of American Consumers and Travelers, consumer group in Illinois
Fertilisers and Chemicals Travancore, a fertilizer and chemical manufacturing company in India
First Aid Care Team, a former emergency medical unit in the US
Foundation for Accountability and Civic Trust
Foundation for Advancement in Cancer Therapy
Foundation for Art and Creative Technology, a multimedia complex in Liverpool, England
First Atheist Church of True Science, founded by Michael Newdow
Civic Action Front of Chad, a defunct political party in Chad
Front for Change and Concord in Chad, a military organisation in Chad

Science and technology
 FACT (biology) (facilitates chromatin transcription), a protein factor affecting eukaryotic cells
 FACT (computer language) (Fully Automated Compiling Technique), programming language that influenced COBOL
 FACT (First G-APD Cherenkov Telescope), a telescope at the Roque de los Muchachos Observatory
 Focus on Alternative and Complementary Therapies, a medical review journal

Other uses
 FACT Act, Fair and Accurate Credit Transactions Act
 Fact (UK magazine), British music and culture magazine
 FACTS (magazine), a weekly magazine from Switzerland
 FACT Stadium, a multi purpose stadium in Eloor, Kerala
 Fast-Attack Craft Target, a U.S. Navy powered seaborne target
 Flexible AC transmission system, for the AC transmission of electrical energy
 Frolikha Adventure Coastline Track, long-distance trail at the northern part of Lake Baikal in Siberia
 Cape Town International Airport (ICAO airport code)
 FACT was a Japanese post-hardcore band

See also
 Fact (disambiguation)